Shanti Govindasamy (born 19 September 1967) is a female sprint athlete who competed for Malaysia at the Asian Games, primarily in the 100 and 200 metre events. Married to R.Kannan a/l P. Rajoo. She has two children; Vinooshana and Thevisshana

International competitions
 GOLD 200m 1991 Southeast Asian Games Manila, Philippines
 SILVER 100m 1991 Southeast Asian Games Manila, Philippines
 SILVER 100m 1993 SEA Games in Singapore
 SILVER 200m 1993 SEA Games in Singapore
 GOLD 4 × 400 m 1993 SEA Games in Singapore
 GOLD 100m 1997 SEA Games in Jakarta, Indonesia
 GOLD 200m 1997 SEA Games in Jakarta, Indonesia
 SILVER 4x400 1997 SEA Games in Jakarta, Indonesia
 BRONZE 100m 1998 Asian Athletics Championships in Fukuoka, Japan
 Fourth place 100m 1998 Asian Games in Bangkok, Thailand
 Fourth place 200m 1998 Asian Games in Bangkok, Thailand

References

External links

1967 births
Living people
Place of birth missing (living people)
Malaysian people of Indian descent
Malaysian female sprinters
Commonwealth Games competitors for Malaysia
Athletes (track and field) at the 1994 Commonwealth Games
Athletes (track and field) at the 1998 Commonwealth Games
Asian Games medalists in athletics (track and field)
Athletes (track and field) at the 1990 Asian Games
Athletes (track and field) at the 1998 Asian Games
World Athletics Championships athletes for Malaysia
Asian Games bronze medalists for Malaysia
Medalists at the 1990 Asian Games
Southeast Asian Games medalists in athletics
Southeast Asian Games gold medalists for Malaysia